The zebra garden eel (Heteroconger polyzona), also known as the banded garden eel, is a species of eel in the conger/garden eels family Congridae. It was described by Pieter Bleeker in 1868. It is a marine, tropical eel which is known from the Indo-Western Pacific, including the Philippines, the Ryukyu Islands, New Guinea, Indonesia and Vanuatu.

References

Heteroconger
Taxa named by Pieter Bleeker
Fish described in 1868